Ralph Frederick Green (8 June 1911 – 9 March 1991) was an Australian rules footballer who played with Sturt in the South Australian National Football League (SANFL). He also had stints at Carlton in the Victorian Football League (VFL) and West Perth in the Western Australian National Football League.

Green, who played as a forward in his early years with Sturt, was lured to Carlton in 1932 and as a result missed out on playing in Sturt's premiership team that season. His time at Carlton was plagued by injuries and he was only able to play five games. In 1933 he returned to Sturt and in the same year represented South Australia at the Sydney Carnival.

The league went into recess for three seasons due to the war and Green served briefly with the Royal Australian Air Force in 1943. He resumed his SANFL career in 1945, as Sturt's playing coach. The following year he did not play or coach at Sturt, with Bo Morton taking up the position of senior coach. In 1947, Green returned to the club after Morton resigned. No longer a player, Morton coached Sturt for two more seasons and guided them to finals in each of those years.

References

1911 births
1991 deaths
Australian rules footballers from South Australia
Carlton Football Club players
West Perth Football Club players
Sturt Football Club players
Sturt Football Club coaches
Royal Australian Air Force personnel of World War II